Pinchas Aryeh Stolper (October 22, 1931 – May 25, 2022) was an American Orthodox rabbi and writer, who was a spokesman for Jewish Orthodoxy through his writings and books popularizing Orthodox Judaism.

Biography
Stolper was a disciple of Rabbi Yitzchak Hutner at the Yeshiva Rabbi Chaim Berlin and at its Kollel Gur Aryeh in Brooklyn. He received degrees from Brooklyn College and from the Graduate Faculty of the New School for Social Research. He passed away at the age of 90 on May 25, 2022 after a prolonged illness.

Chaim Berlin
Stolper attended Yeshivas Chaim Berlin due to an interesting sequence of events.
A few short years after the Holocaust, then-Mayor of New York Vincent Impellitteri invited a German soccer team to City Hall and honored them with a reception. With the pain of the Holocaust still fresh, Stolper felt it his duty to stand up and protest what he considered a serious affront to the memories of the six million.

He and 12 other people gathered to distribute leaflets and throw rotten tomatoes at the mayor, his entourage and the German soccer team. The reception was ruined and Stolper was arrested. Stolper’s picture was splashed on the front cover of the New York Daily Mirror as well as many other papers.

The following day Rabbi Hutner was eating breakfast together with Rabbi Chaim Feuerman and was perusing a copy of the Daily Mirror. Hutner pointed to the picture of the then 18 year old Pinchas Stolper and exclaimed "This young man has chutzpah. We need him in our Yeshiva." From that event Stolper was enrolled into Yeshivas Chaim Berlin and became one of the central talmidim of Hutner dedicating his life to disseminating Hutner's Torah to the world.

NCSY
Stolper was the first National Director of the National Conference of Synagogue Youth (NCSY) of the Orthodox Union. He subsequently served for close to twenty years as the head of the Orthodox Union as its executive vice-president, retiring from that position in 2003.

Family
He is survived by his wife Elaine and two of their three children, Michal Cohen and Akiva Stolper, having been predeceased by a daughter, Malie Kaweblum. His surviving brother is Daniel Stolper; their parents were Dovid Dov Stolper, a pulpit rabbi in Brooklyn, and Nesha Stolper.

Rabbi Aryeh Kaplan
Stolper was also influential in bringing the works of Rabbi Aryeh Kaplan to the world. In Stolper's introduction to The Aryeh Kaplan Anthology he records how he " discovered"  Kaplan. " I first encountered this extraordinary individual when by chance I spotted his article on "Immortality in the Soul" in "Intercom," the journal of the Association of Orthodox Jewish Scientists, and was taken by his unusual ability to explain a difficult topic- one usually reserved for advanced scholars, a topic almost untouched previously in English- with such simplicity that it could be understood by any intelligent reader. It was clear to me that his special talent could fill a significant void in English Judaica. I always counted as one of my greatest z'chusim (a spiritual merit granted by G-D) to have had the privilege of "discovering" Rabbi Kaplan. And once we met, we became lifelong friends. When I invited Rabbi Kaplan to write on the concept of Tefillin for the Orthodox Union's National Conference of Synagogue Youth (NCSY), he completed the 96- page manuscript of G-D, Man and Tefillin with sources and footnotes from the Talmud, Midrash and Zohar- in less than 2 weeks. The book- masterful, comprehensive, inspiring yet simple- set a pattern which was to chararcterize all of his succeeding works".

Books 
A prolific writer and editor, Stolper was responsible for over 20 volumes and hundreds of articles on Jewish life and thought earning him a broad following as a major Jewish thinker, innovator and leader.

Pesach (NCSY, first published 1962)
Tested Teen Age Activities NCSY, first published 1964)
Revelation what Happened on Sinai? (NCSY, first published 1966)
Jewish Alternatives in Love, Dating and Marriage (NCSY, first published 1967). Renamed: The Sacred Trust: Love, Dating and Marriage: The Jewish View
How do I Know it is Kosher (NCSY, first published 1968)
Real Messiah: A Jewish Response to Missionaries (NCSY, first published 1976)
Purim in a New Light: Mystery, Grandeur and Depth: Revealed through the writings of Rabbi Yitzchak Hutner (Israel Book Shop, first published 2003)
Living Beyond Time: The Mystery and Meaning of the Jewish Festivals (Shaar Press/ArtScroll, first published 2003)
Chanukah in a New light: Grandeur, Heroism and Depth: As revealed through the writings of Rabbi Yitzchak Hutner (Israel Book Shop, first published 2005)

References

External links
Articles by Pinchas Stolper:
Revelation: The basis of faith
Love, Dating and Romance
Why Do We Still Mourn?

1931 births
2022 deaths
21st-century American Jews
American Orthodox rabbis
The New School alumni